is a passenger railway station in located in the city of Higashiōsaka, Osaka Prefecture, Japan, operated by West Japan Railway Company (JR West).

Lines

Station layout
The station has two elevated side platforms, each capable of accommodating eight-car trains, with the station building underneath

Platforms

Adjacent stations

History
The name of the new station was announced by JR West on 26 September 2017. The station was opened on 17 March 2018 as an infill station as part of the Osaka Higashi Line project.

Passenger statistics
The station is forecast to be used by approximately 4,500 passengers daily. In fiscal 2019, the station was used by an average of 2416 passengers daily (boarding passengers only).

Surrounding area
The station is located close to the boundary between the city of Higashiōsaka and Hirano-ku, Osaka, and takes its name from the two areas it serves: Kizuri in Higashiosaka and Kamikita in Hirano-ku.

The following schools are located near the station.
 Kashita Junior High School
 Nagase Junior High School
 Higashiosaka Nagasenishi Elementary School
 Nagaseminami Elementary School
 Osaka Kamikita Elementary School

See also
 List of railway stations in Japan

References

External links

 JR West news release 
Official home page 

Stations of West Japan Railway Company
Railway stations in Osaka Prefecture
Railway stations in Japan opened in 2018
Higashiōsaka